Viviana Andreattini (born 2 May 1960), known under the stage name of Vivien Vee, is a retired Italian singer.

Life and career
Born in Trieste, Vee debuted in 1979 as an electronic disco project produced by Claudio Simonetti and Giancarlo Meo.

Her song "Give Me a Break" became a minor hit in the American dance charts. The song "Higher" peaked at No. 36 in the Italian Chart. Another song of hers, "Remember", was featured in the 2005 video game The Warriors. She released her last single in 1989.

Between 1982 and 1984, she posed semi-nude in men's magazines such as Playmen, Blitz, and the Italian edition of Playboy.

Discography

Albums
1979: Vivien Vee
1979: Give Me a Break
1983: With Vivien Vee

Selected singles
1979: "Give Me a Break"
1979: "Remember"
1981: "Pick Up"
1983: "Just For Me"
1983: "Higher"
1984: "Americano"
1987: "Heartbeat"
1989: "Cross My Heart"

References

Further reading 
 "Vivien Vee, la triestina del rock", La Stampa, March 26, 1983, p.21

External links 
 Vivien Vee at Discogs

1960 births
Italian women singers
Living people
Musicians from Trieste
Italian Italo disco musicians
Italian pop singers
English-language singers from Italy